Heikko Glöde (born 12 July 1961 in West Berlin) is a retired German football manager and former player.

Glöde made a total of 11 Bundesliga appearances for Hertha BSC and played in a further 325 2. Bundesliga games for a number of different clubs during his playing career.

References

External links 
 
 

1961 births
Living people
Footballers from Berlin
German footballers
Association football midfielders
Association football forwards
Bundesliga players
2. Bundesliga players
Hertha BSC players
Tennis Borussia Berlin players
VfL Osnabrück players
1. FC Saarbrücken players
German football managers
SC Staaken players